Daniel de Rémy de Courcelle, Sieur de Montigny, de La Fresnaye et de Courcelle (1626 – 24 October 1698) was the Governor General of New France from 1665 to 1672.

Daniel de Rémy had the Carignan-Salières Regiment and their Lieutenant General Alexander de Prouville, Sieur de Tracy at his command when he arrived in Canada. Through Alexander de Prouville and by personal expeditions, he carried out an aggressive war against the Iroquois peoples.
 
His main contributions to the colony during his tenure were the actions he took to resolve conflicts amongst the various Indian tribes and to raise the status of the French within the native societies. This promoted peace for New France and retained substantial fur trade that was in danger of being taken over by the Dutch and the English. He also approved Robert La Salle's plan to mount expeditions to seek a western passage to China.

He was instrumental in upgrading the judicial procedures of the colony along with Intendant Jean Talon and, acting on the orders of Louis XIV, he established militia units in New France. This militia would be instrumental in the colony’s future wars.

In January 1666, the French invaded the Iroquois homeland in present-day New York. The first invasion force, of 400 or 500 men, was led by Daniel de Rémy de Courcelle. His men were greatly outnumbered by the Iroquois and were forced to withdraw before any significant action could take place. Although the invasion was abortive, they took Chief Canaqueese prisoner.

See also 

 Vincent Basset Du Tartre

Notes

External links 
 Biography at the Dictionary of Canadian Biography Online

1626 births
1698 deaths
Governors of New France
17th-century Canadian politicians